Acronicta albistigma is a moth of the family Noctuidae. It is found in Asia, including Taiwan.

References

External links
Moths of Taiwan

Acronicta
Moths of Asia
Moths described in 1909